Se So Neon is a South Korean indie rock band consisting of members Hwang So-yoon, U-su and Park Hyun-jin. Since their formation in 2016, the band has released the EPs Summer Plumage (2017) and Nonadaptation (2020). In 2018, the band won the awards for Rookie of the Year and Best Rock Song at the Korean Music Awards.

History 
Se So Neon was established in 2016 and began as a project band between Hwang So-yoon and Gangto. Their name, which literally translates to 'new kids' or 'new boys', was chosen by Hwang after coming across an issue of the now-defunct children's magazine Sae So Nyeon in a bookstore. The band became a trio when they recruited bassist Fancy Moon. In October 2017, they released their first EP, titled 여름깃 (Summer Plumage).

In December 2018, Se So Neon announced Gangto and Fancy Moon had left the band to perform their military service.
They were replaced by Park Hyun-jin on bass and U-su on drums, who were recruited by Hwang through a self-tape audition. In August 2022, the band announced the departure of U-su, citing his wish to continue activities as a solo drummer as the primary reason.

Discography

Extended plays

Singles

Awards and accolades

References

South Korean indie rock groups
Musical groups established in 2016
Korean Music Award winners
2016 establishments in South Korea